Ricardo Vieira Coutinho (born November 18, 1960, in João Pessoa) is a Brazilian politician who served as the 50th governor of the Brazilian state of Paraíba from 2011 until 2019. Previously, he was the mayor of João Pessoa from 2005 to 2010.

See also
 List of mayors of João Pessoa, Paraíba

References

1960 births
Governors of Paraíba
Living people
People from João Pessoa, Paraíba